Heriberto Hermes (25 May 1933 – 3 January 2018) was an American-born Roman Catholic bishop.

Hermes was ordained a priest in 1960 and consecrated a bishop in 1990. He served as bishop of Cristalândia until retirement in 2009. Hermes was born in Shallow Water, Kansas, United States on 25 May 1933. He died at the age of 84 on 3 January 2018, at the General Hospital in Palmas, Tocantins.

References

1933 births
2018 deaths
People from Scott County, Kansas
20th-century Roman Catholic bishops in Brazil
21st-century Roman Catholic bishops in Brazil
Religious leaders from Kansas
American Benedictines
Catholics from Kansas
20th-century American clergy
21st-century American clergy
Roman Catholic bishops of Cristalândia